Ezekiel Aaron Moreno (born October 8, 1978) is a former professional American football linebacker.

Early years
Moreno, who is of Mexican descent, attended Castle Park High School in Chula Vista and was a letterman in football and baseball.  In football,

College career
Moreno played college football for the University of Southern California's defense from 1998-2000.  Known as "Zeke And Destroy" by many USC-faithful, Moreno was a force in the middle of the USC defense.

Professional career
Moreno was drafted by the San Diego Chargers in the fifth round (139th pick overall) of the 2001 NFL Draft. He played for the Chargers for four years (2001–2004).  Moreno was released by the Chargers following the 2004 season and was hampered by injuries while trying to find a home with another team in 2005. He signed with the Hamilton Tiger-Cats of the Canadian Football League in 2007. He was selected as a CFL All-Star in 2007 and 2008.

On September 9, 2008, Moreno was traded to the Winnipeg Blue Bombers.

On February 19, 2009, Moreno was traded to the Toronto Argonauts in exchange for defensive end Riall Johnson.

On February 21, 2010, Moreno was released by the Argonauts.

Records
 Most single season tackles by a Hamilton Tiger-Cat (114)

References

External links
Toronto Argonauts bio

1978 births
Living people
American football linebackers
American players of Canadian football
Hamilton Tiger-Cats players
Sportspeople from Chula Vista, California
Philadelphia Eagles players
Sacramento Mountain Lions players
San Diego Chargers players
Toronto Argonauts players
USC Trojans football players
Winnipeg Blue Bombers players
American sportspeople of Mexican descent